B-Sides is a compilation album of B-sides, bonus tracks, cover versions and previously unreleased recordings by Canadian hard rock band Danko Jones. It was released on 2 February 2009, in Europe only.

Track listing

Personnel
 Danko Jones – vocals, guitar
 John Calabrese – bass
 Damon Richardson – drums on tracks 1, 2, 7, 10, 12, 13, 15, 17, 18, 21, 22, 27
 Michael Caricari – drums on tracks 3, 4, 6, 9, 11, 14, 16, 20, 23, 24, 26
 Dan Cornelius – drums on tracks 5, 8, 19, 25

References

Danko Jones albums
2009 compilation albums
B-side compilation albums
Bad Taste Records compilation albums